Samson Fried Estate, also known as "Birch Hill," is a historic estate located at Severance in Essex County, New York.  The estate has a Shingle Style main house, built as a summer residence in 1902, and nine contributing outbuildings.  The main house is a large, two story rambling, roughly "L" shaped frame residence.  It features hipped- and shed-roof dormers, four massive stone chimneys, second floor balconies, and a third story widow's walk.  There is also a wide verandah around three sides of the house.  The contributing buildings and structures include a garage, barn, hen house, tennis court, guest cottage, ice house, and well.

It was listed on the National Register of Historic Places in 1987.

References

Houses on the National Register of Historic Places in New York (state)
Shingle Style houses
Houses completed in 1902
Houses in Essex County, New York
National Register of Historic Places in Essex County, New York
Shingle Style architecture in New York (state)